Queen of the Mississippi, originally American Eagle, is an overnight riverboat owned and operated by American Cruise Lines (ACL). She entered service in spring 2015 and was built by Chesapeake Shipbuilding in Salisbury, Maryland for overnight river cruising within the continental United States. The vessel accommodates 150 passengers in her 84 staterooms
.  The vessel is a sister ship to American Pride, which originally carried the Queen of the Mississippi name from 2012 to 2015.  However, there are some differences between the vessels, like internal arrangement and cabins on the 5th deck.  Like her sister ship, all have private baths, windows, Wi-Fi, and interior entrances.

The ship deck plans:
 1st Deck - double- and single-occupancy staterooms; dining room
 2nd Deck - double- and single-occupancy staterooms, all with private balconies; three lounges
 3rd Deck - owners suites, double- and single-occupancy staterooms, all with sliding doors to private balconies; library
 4th Deck - owners suites, double- and single-occupancy staterooms, all with sliding doors to private balconies; two lounges
 5th Deck - Pilot house, double- and single-occupancy staterooms, promenade, shaded public area, sundeck, putting green

Queen of the Mississippi entered service in 2015, joining her sister boat American Pride.  American Cruise Lines has not said if the name change to "Queen of the Mississippi" is permanent or temporary until the previously announced replacement vessel for "American Pride" launches in 2017.

Her stern-mounted paddlewheel is driven by a hydraulic motor, powered by diesel engines. This is augmented by two Z-drive units to provide a higher cruising speed and better maneuverability.

References

External links
 Official website

2015 ships
Cruise ships of the United States
Ships built in Salisbury, Maryland